Lionair may refer to:

Lion Air, a major Indonesian Low-cost airline
Lionair (Luxembourg), a defunct Luxembourgish airline
Lionair (Philippines), a defunct Philippine charter airline
Lionair (Sri Lanka), a defunct Sri Lankan charter airline